Morton Fine (December 24, 1916 – March 7, 1991) was an American screenwriter.

A native of Baltimore, Maryland, Fine worked in an advertising agency, a bookstore, and an aircraft factory before joining the Army Air Force in 1942. A graduate of St. John's College in Annapolis, Fine returned to school after his military service ended in 1944 and earned a master's degree in English from the University of Pittsburgh. After an unprofitable stint writing for magazines, he moved to California and turned to writing for radio programs. It was then that he met David Friedkin and began a long writing partnership. Fine wrote several nationally broadcast radio shows in collaboration with David Friedkin, including Broadway Is My Beat and Crime Classics.

The writing duo then moved on to film and television where their credits include The Pawnbroker (for which he won the Writers Guild of America Award for Best Written American Drama in 1965), The Nativity, The Greek Tycoon, I Spy, The Next Man, The Most Deadly Game, and several television Westerns including The Rifleman, The Big Valley, Maverick, The Virginian and more.

References

External links

1916 births
1991 deaths
American male screenwriters
Writers from Baltimore
St. John's College (Annapolis/Santa Fe) alumni
University of Pittsburgh alumni
Writers Guild of America Award winners
Screenwriters from Maryland
20th-century American male writers
20th-century American screenwriters